An instant hot water dispenser or boiling water tap is an appliance that dispenses water at about  (near-boiling). There are hot-only and hot and cool water models, and the water may be filtered as well as heated. Instant hot water dispensers became popular in the 1970s. Instant hot water dispensers are very similar to portable shower devices; the latter is fitted with a heating element and quickly heats up water, once a switch has been activated.

Types

Boil-on-demand 
Such instant hot water dispensers consist of a heater and are capable of boiling a small amount of water very quickly. They are usually small and portable and unlike regular dispensers, they do not have a separate hot tank for boiled water. While this reduces power consumption, such dispensers are not suitable for heating large quantities of water and often need to be refilled.

Hot water tank dispensers 
Plumbed directly into the water supply and heated in an under-sink or over-counter tank (fixed to the wall); hot water is dispensed through a faucet at the sink. They may have a built-in water filter and a thermostat to adjust the water temperature. There is no need to fill them, they can produce large amounts of hot water, the water temperature is adjustable, they are expensive and require plumbing work, are not portable, and waste some electricity keeping water hot at all times.

Thermo pot electric kettle hot water dispensers 

A combination of electric kettle and hot water flask; water is heated in the pot and left in the insulated pot ready to be pumped out by a built-in electric pump or a manual push-down pump. They do not need to be installed, are portable, may have adjustable temperature, need to be refilled (capacity is typically 2 to 5 liters), and waste some electricity keeping water hot at all times.

Bottom load water dispenser 

A special dispenser where the water bottle is placed at the bottom of the dispenser. This is very convenient as the bottle does not have to be lifted up and placed upside down.

Table top water dispenser 
A smaller unit which can be placed directly on top of the table for dispensing hot or cold water. This is also frequently known as a countertop water dispenser.

Direct piping water dispenser 
Connects directly to the water source for an auto refill of constant hot or cold filtered pure drinking water.

Operation 

Most types have a small thermally-insulated tank with a heater which keeps the water in the hot tank.

When the handle is pressed, cool tap water flows into the tank and displaces the near-boiling water, which flows out of the spout. On releasing the handle the valve closes and hot water stops flowing.

Some tanks feature a 750 W heater that delivers up to 14 liters (60 U.S. cups) of water per hour at a temperature set by a dial. Some models are equipped with a filtration system to remove contaminants, and can dispense hot or cool filtered water. Advanced filtration systems can reduce chlorine taste, odor, sediment, toxic chemicals, heavy metals such as lead, and dangerous minerals. 

They also remove sometimes dangerous parasites and protozoa such as cryptosporidium, although the high temperature prevents them from being a hazard in the hot water.

Energy efficiency 

A hot water dispenser which keeps water hot in a tank uses the energy needed to heat the water to the required temperature and wastes the energy needed to keep the water hot permanently in a thermally-insulated tank when not being used. These tank type dispensers often also consists of energy wasting 'keep warm' and 'reboil' functions.

On the other hand, an instant hot water dispenser without a tank does not waste significant energy. When hot water is needed, the instant heater consumes at least 2000 watts to produce hot water at 92°C and above. The hot water flow rate is approximately 20 litres per hour. Comparing this with the insulated tank type of hot water dispensers that consumes approximately 500 W, the amount of energy savings to produce 20 litres of hot water is at least 5 times lower. The savings not only comes from the speed, but also instant hot water dispensers do not 'keep warm' nor 'reboil'. In fact, it further provides the convenience that users need not switch off the appliance when not in use. 

In many cases the alternative is to heat water in a device like a kettle. If only the amount of water needed is heated, energy usage is less: the same energy is used for heating [needs clarification: only true if the kettle and the dispenser have the same thermal transfer, which is very unlikely], but none for keeping hot. If more water than needed is boiled in a kettle, energy is wasted in heating the unwanted water, which then cools.

Sometimes a supply of an unknown amount of instant hot water is required, for example when cooking risotto boiling water must be added instantly as needed. This can only be achieved with a kettle by boiling the maximum amount that can be needed; in cases of this nature the instant water heater, which heats and dispenses only what is needed, is always more efficient.

Overall comparative efficiency can only be estimated by calculating the energy wasted by the water heater, and comparing it with that wasted by heating more water than necessary in a kettle in typical circumstances. Kettle efficiency is subject to patterns of usage, and can be improved by user discipline; dispenser efficiency cannot be so improved. Switching off when not needed, as at night, would save a lot of energy and improve overall efficiency.

Installation 

Instant hot water tank dispensers can be installed by owners or plumbers, usually in a standard sink hole with the tank below the sink.

See also 
Water dispenser
Water heating
 Electric water boiler
 Electric kettle
 Zojirushi Corporation
 Tiger Corporation

References 

Boilers (cookware)